Gerald Barry MC (18 December 1896 – 21 February 1977) was a career officer in the British Army who played in one first-class cricket match for the Combined Services against Essex.

In the match, played at Leyton in May 1922, Barry batted at No 10 in the Services team's two innings and scored only two runs, and opened the bowling in each Essex innings without taking a wicket. He did not play first-class cricket again.

Barry was educated at Eton College, from which he joined the Coldstream Guards in the First World War. He was awarded the Military Cross. He later rose to the tank of lieutenant colonel in the Black Watch. During the Second World War, his postings included deputy military secretary of the Eastern Army in India.

Barry married Lady Margaret Pleydell-Bouverie, daughter of Jacob Pleydell-Bouverie, 6th Earl of Radnor in 1923. They had five daughters and one son. His brother-in-law was Nigel Capel-Cure, who also played one first-class cricket match.

References

1896 births
1977 deaths
People educated at Eton College
English cricketers
Combined Services cricketers
Coldstream Guards officers
Black Watch officers
Recipients of the Military Cross
British Army personnel of World War I
British Army personnel of World War II
People from Great Witchingham